Morland Graham (8 August 1891 – 8 April 1949) was a British film actor.

Graham had a career on the stage spanning over 35 years. He was known as a character actor, but also wrote a one act comedy, C'est la Guerre, which was first performed in October 1926 and subsequently at the following year's Scottish Community Drama Festival.

Graham became best known for his film roles in Jamaica Inn (1939), Old Bill and Son (1941) and Bonnie Prince Charlie (1948), in which he starred after deputising for actor Will Fyffe. He appeared as the Biffer in Whisky Galore! which was released after his death.

Graham married Elsie Cole (née Press) in 1926. He died on 8 April 1949 after taking an overdose of aspirin while suffering from ill health and, according to his wife, "nervous depression". He had recently turned down an offer of stage work from Alistair Sim because he "did not feel up to it".

Filmography

References

External links
 

1891 births
1949 suicides
20th-century Scottish male actors
Male actors from Glasgow
Scottish male film actors
Scottish male stage actors
Drug-related suicides in England